Rory Alexander McArdle (born 1 May 1987) is a professional footballer who plays as a defender for League Two club Harrogate Town. He has previously played for Sheffield Wednesday, Rochdale, Aberdeen, Bradford City and Scunthorpe United, and represented the Northern Ireland national football team.

Club career

Aberdeen
On 19 May 2010, McArdle signed a contract with Scottish Premier League club Aberdeen. Near the end of the 2011–12 season, McArdle was advised that his contract with Aberdeen would not be extended.

Bradford City

McArdle signed for Bradford City on 6 June 2012, signing a two-year contract. He made his debut on 11 August in a 1–0 win in the League Cup against Notts County. He made his league debut a week later against Gillingham. He made his home debut on 21 August, in a 1–0 win against Fleetwood Town. He scored his first goal for the club on 25 August in a 5–1 win against AFC Wimbledon. On 8 January, McArdle scored a header against Premier League side Aston Villa in the first leg of the semi-final of the League Cup, as Bradford incredibly won 3–1. He also played in the second leg, which saw Bradford advance to the final 4–3 on aggregate. He started in the final which Bradford lost to Premier League side Swansea City. He scored his second league goal for the club on 1 April, helping Bradford to a 3–1 away to Torquay United. He then scored in the 2013 Football League Two play-off Final, which Bradford won 3–0 against Northampton Town securing promotion to League One. On 3 August, the opening day of the season, McArdle scored a late header from a Raffaele De Vita corner to give Bradford a point in a 2–2 draw against Bristol City.

He was Bradford City's 2014–15 Player of the Year.

Scunthorpe United
McArdle signed a three-year deal with fellow League One club Scunthorpe United on 21 June 2017, with the deal coming into effect from 1 July 2017.

Exeter City
On 19 May 2020, McArdle signed a contract with League Two club Exeter City. He scored his first goal for the club in February 2021, a 'trademark near-post header' in a 1–0 win over Stevenage.

Harrogate Town
On 30 June 2021, McArdle joined fellow League Two club Harrogate Town for an undisclosed fee. McArdle signed a new one-year deal in May 2022.

International career
McArdle made his full debut for Northern Ireland on 26 May 2010 against Turkey in a friendly.

Career statistics

References

External links

1987 births
Living people
Footballers from Sheffield
English footballers
Association footballers from Northern Ireland
Northern Ireland youth international footballers
Northern Ireland under-21 international footballers
Northern Ireland international footballers
Association football defenders
Sheffield Wednesday F.C. players
Rochdale A.F.C. players
Aberdeen F.C. players
Bradford City A.F.C. players
Scunthorpe United F.C. players
English Football League players
Scottish Premier League players
English people of Irish descent
Harrogate Town A.F.C. players